Compsenia is a genus of moths of the family Erebidae. The genus was erected by Paul Dognin in 1914.

Species
Compsenia area (H. Druce, 1891) Panama
Compsenia catagrapha Schaus, 1916 French Guiana
Compsenia furtiva Dognin, 1914 Colombia
Compsenia gracillima (Herrich-Schäffer, 1870) Cuba
Compsenia insulalis Schaus, 1916 Cuba
Compsenia plumbea (Schaus, 1913) Costa Rica

References

Herminiinae